Kessler Park Historic District is located in the Kessler area of Dallas, Texas (USA). It was added to the National Register on June 17, 1994. 

On May 25, 2005, the Kessler Park Conservation District was established as the 13th conservation district in the city of Dallas. The conservation district includes the 4 original additions of the historic district as well as 3 post-war developments. It is generally bounded by Interstate 30 to the north, West Colorado Boulevard to the south, Sylvan Avenue to the east, and the Stevens Park Golf Course to the west.

Architecture
The 4 original additions of the Kessler Park Historic District have a largely intact collection of 1920s-1940s mansions in the styles of Tudor Revival, Misson Revival, Spanish Revival, and American Craftsman. The 3 post-war additions in the conservation districts were first developed in the 1950s and feature Mid-Century Modern and Ranch-Style architecture.

Kessler Park preserves many homes designed by famous architects in Dallas including Carsey & Linskie, Charles S. Dilbeck, and Harold Prinz.
Homes in Kessler Park have been featured in D Magazine's "the 10 Most Beautiful/Charming Homes in Dallas" annual list in multiple years.

See also

National Register of Historic Places listings in Dallas County, Texas

References

National Register of Historic Places in Dallas
Dallas Landmarks
Tudor Revival architecture in Texas
Historic districts on the National Register of Historic Places in Texas